The 1954 Nevada gubernatorial election was held on November 2, 1954. Incumbent Republican Charles H. Russell defeated Democratic nominee and former Governor Vail M. Pittman on a re-match with 53.10% of the vote.

Primary elections
Primary elections were held on June 1, 1954.

Democratic primary

Candidates
Vail M. Pittman, former Governor
Archie C. Grant
Thomas B. Mechling
Merrill Inch
Simon W. Conwell

Results

General election

Candidates
Charles H. Russell, Republican 
Vail M. Pittman, Democratic

Results

References

1954
Nevada
Gubernatorial